Bere Stream is an 11.2 hectare biological Site of Special Scientific Interest in Dorset, notified in 1977.

Sources
 English Nature citation sheet for the site (accessed 8 September 2006)

External links
 English Nature website (SSSI information)

Sites of Special Scientific Interest in Dorset
Sites of Special Scientific Interest notified in 1977
2Bere